Jean-François Houle (born January 14, 1975) is a Canadian  professional ice hockey coach and former player. He is currently the head coach of the Laval Rocket in the American Hockey League (AHL). He was the head coach of the Bakersfield Condors during their last season in the ECHL. He was then hired by the Edmonton Oilers to be an assistant coach of their relocated AHL franchise that became the Bakersfield Condors in 2015, where he remained until 2021. 

Houle attended Clarkson University where he played NCAA Division I hockey with the Golden Knights men's ice hockey team. Houle was selected by the Montreal Canadiens in the 4th round (99th overall) of the 1993 NHL Entry Draft.

In 2002, following a five-year career as a professional hockey player, Houle re-joined the Clarkson Golden Knights as an assistant coach. In 2010, he accepted the position of head coach for the Lewiston MAINEiacs of the QMJHL, and the following season he moved to take on the head coaching job with Blainville-Boisbriand Armada.

Houle is the son of longtime Montreal Canadiens forward and general manager Réjean Houle.

Awards and honours

References

External links

1975 births
Living people
Blainville-Boisbriand Armada coaches
Canadian ice hockey left wingers
Cincinnati Mighty Ducks players
Clarkson Golden Knights men's ice hockey players
Fredericton Canadiens players
Ice hockey people from Quebec City
Lewiston Maineiacs coaches
Montreal Canadiens draft picks
New Orleans Brass players
Tallahassee Tiger Sharks players
Canadian ice hockey coaches